Uredo musae is a fungus that is a plant pathogen, infecting bananas.

References

External links 
 Index Fungorum
 USDA ARS Fungal Database

Fungal plant pathogens and diseases
Banana diseases
Basidiomycota enigmatic taxa
Fungi described in 1941